Yesica Arrien (born 1 July 1980) is an Argentine footballer who plays as a defender for Racing Club de Avellaneda. She was a member of the Argentina women's national team.

International career
Arrien played for Argentina at the 2008 Summer Olympics.

See also
 Argentina at the 2008 Summer Olympics

References

External links
 
 profile at sports-reference.com

1980 births
Living people
Women's association football defenders
Argentine women's footballers
Argentina women's international footballers
2003 FIFA Women's World Cup players
Olympic footballers of Argentina
Footballers at the 2008 Summer Olympics
Boca Juniors (women) footballers